Oriental Revolutionary Movement (Spanish: Movimiento Revolucionario Oriental, MRO) is a far-left Marxist–Leninist communist party in Uruguay.

From 1967 to 1985, it had an armed wing, the Oriental Revolutionary Armed Forces (Fuerzas Armadas Revolucionarias Orientales). Politically, being one of the founders of Frente Amplio, it left the alliance in 1993 and is now part of the far-left Comisiones Unitarias Antiimperialistas (COMUNA).

History

MRO was founded by Ariel Collazo on April 21, 1961, following a split from the Partido Blanco. He traveled to Cuba and became a Marxist–Leninist under the influence of Che Guevara and the Cuban Revolution. The establishment of the MRO involved a large number of members of the Communist Party of Uruguay who left the party and former executives, fiercely criticizing the anti-Stalinist and revisionist lines of the Communist Party of Uruguay.

In 1971, MRO was one of the founding organizations of Frente Amplio. It left Frente Amplio in 1993.

Since 2008, it has been part of the electoral alliance Comisiones Unitarias Antiimperialistas (COMUNA) which however failed at the admission for the 2009 election and didn't run in 2014. Current General Secretary is Mario Rossi Garretano.

Structure
MRO has a youth wing, the "Guevarist Youth" and a mass front, the "Revolutionary Front for a Socialist Alternative". MRO publishes Los Orientales.

See also
 Tupamaros – National Liberation Movement
 Revolutionary Left Movement
 Revolutionary Movement Tupamaro
 Revolutionary Armed Forces of Colombia
 National Liberation Army
 Paraguayan People's Army

References

External links
 

Communism in Uruguay
Communist parties in Uruguay
Communist militant groups
Far-left politics in Uruguay
1961 establishments in Uruguay
Political parties established in 1961
Paramilitary organizations based in Uruguay